Talking to the Dead may refer to:

Talking to the Dead (album), by Rosemary's Babies
Talking to the Dead (TV series)
Talking to the Dead, the first episode of Penn & Teller: Bullshit!
Talking to the Dead, a 1993 short story collection by Sylvia Watanabe
Talking to the Dead (novel), a 1996 novel by Helen Dunmore
Talking to the Dead, a 2007 poetry collection by Elaine Feinstein
Talking to the Dead, a 2011 book by Rosemary Ellen Guiley

See also
Séance, an attempt to communicate with spirits